is a spinning roller coaster at Universal Studios Japan in Osaka, Japan. The ride opened on March 18, 2010, as a replacement for the E.T. Adventure dark ride. The ride is themed to a journey through space and features an array of special effects and immersive theming including interactive projection screens, on-board audio, lasers and fibre optics.

History
In March 2009, Universal Studios Japan announced that they would be closing E.T. Adventure on May 10, 2009. Following the ride's closure in May, the ride system was removed with Universal Studios Japan temporarily reopening the attraction as a walkthrough attraction for five days from July 18, 2009.

On September 14, 2009, the park announced a new indoor ride would open in 2010, replacing in E.T. Adventure. Less than one month later, the park announced their new ride's name would be Space Fantasy – The Ride. In December 2009, Universal Studios Japan stated the ride was scheduled to open on March 18, 2010. On March 18, 2010, Space Fantasy – The Ride officially opened to the public.

The ride is often overlaid to work with VR for half a year in order to promote the Cool Japan campaign.

Characteristics

Space Fantasy – The Ride is a spinning roller coaster manufactured by Mack Rides, a German amusement ride manufacturer. The ride was custom-built so it could fit within the existing show building, formerly used for the E.T. Adventure ride.

Statistics
The trains are themed as solar shuttles.

Trains
As Universal Studios Japan is the busiest non-Disney park in the world, Space Fantasy – The Ride features nineteen 8-person trains catering for an hourly capacity of 1920 riders. Each train features a pair four-seater cars. Riders are grouped in pairs and sit back-to-back on the round vehicles. The trains are fitted with on-board speakers which provide a soundtrack throughout the roller coaster ride, as well as monitors which display various items relevant to the ride's theme and storyline.

Theme
As the name suggests, Space Fantasy – The Ride, is themed as a journey through space. Riders begin their journey on planet Earth with the objective of restoring life to the sun by collecting stardust. Their journey takes them past many planets including Saturn and Mercury, as well as past voids, stars, nebulae and comets. To help develop this theme, Universal Studios Japan contracted American-based interactive technology firm GestureTek. GestureTek's 3D camera tracking technology and multi-touch technology was employed to recognise gestures of guests both in the queue and on board the ride.

Ride experience

Riders enter the queue for Space Fantasy – The Ride from the Hollywood section of Universal Studios Japan. As part of the ride's theme, queue features an  wall which is able to recognise the movements of up 132 hands on 66 guests without them physically having to touch the wall. The wall is powered by 22 3D cameras and 13 projectors connected to an array of 16 quad core computers. Space Fantasy – The Ride features separate queues for single riders and holders of Universal Express Passes, as well as offering "child switch" where one parent can experience the ride while the other parent looks after their child before switching their roles.

The station of the roller coaster features a conveyor belt loading system. This system allows the ride to achieve its relatively high throughput of 1920 riders per hour. Once the trains are loaded they are dispatched up the first lift hills. On one of the lift hills, riders are able to interact with the surrounding screens by effectively collecting "stardust clouds" to help power the sun. Aside from interactive technologies, Space Fantasy – The Ride also features a collection of standard projection screens, lasers, fiber optics. Throughout the 275-second ride, the individual four-seater cars perform both magnetic-controlled spins and uncontrolled spins; the latter relies on the riders' weight distribution coupled with the force of gravity. After navigating the  track, the trains return to the station where riders disembark and return to Universal Studios Japan's Hollywood themed area.

Reception
Space Fantasy – The Ride has generally been well received. Park World Magazine stated the ride is "packed with exciting features and fun theming". They also commended the ride for its "controlled car movements and added effects", when compared with other spinning roller coasters. Christina Warren of Mashable provided a review of the ride's special effects, describing them as incredible. Warren also stated she "can't wait for some of this technology to hit American theme parks".

In November 2011, Space Fantasy – The Ride received a Thea Award For Outstanding Achievement. The 18th Annual Thea Awards were presented by the Themed Entertainment Association (TEA) and held at the International Association of Amusement Parks and Attractions (IAPPA) trade show in Orlando, Florida. TEA described the ride as "a thrilling experience that delivers an engaging story using advanced effects in a meaningful way, making an on-the-spot connection with its target audience".

Although the ride did not receive a ranking in its debut year, Space Fantasy – The Ride ranked 91 out of 365 roller coasters featured in the worldwide Best Roller Coaster Poll. The Best Roller Coaster Poll is recognised by park owners and enthusiasts alike, due to its ranking algorithm which prevents the poll from being purely a popularity contest.

References

External links
 
 
 

Roller coasters operated by Universal Parks & Resorts
Universal Studios Japan
Universal Parks & Resorts attractions by name
Outer space in amusement parks
Gesture recognition
2010 establishments in Japan